The High Commission of Nigeria in London is the diplomatic mission of Nigeria in the United Kingdom.

In 2012 a protest was held outside the High Commission by people opposed to the cut in fuel subsidies introduced by President Goodluck Jonathan.

The current High Commissioner is Ambassador Sarafa Tunji Isola.

Gallery

References

External links
 Official site

Nigeria
Diplomatic missions of Nigeria
Nigeria–United Kingdom relations
Grade II listed buildings in the City of Westminster
Nigeria and the Commonwealth of Nations